Conover may refer to:

People
 Conover (surname)

Places in the United States
 Conover, Iowa, a ghost town
 Conover, North Carolina, a city
 Conover, Ohio, an unincorporated community
 Conover, Wisconsin, a town
 Conover (community), Wisconsin, an unincorporated community